Loris Holland is a Guyanese born composer, record producer, keyboardist and songwriter, residing in America. He is also known as Time Shadow.

Biography
Holland grew up in the British Guyana, in a family which forbade any music other than hymns and classical music, due to the deaths of his maternal grandfather and uncle on separate occasions, whilst playing popular music at a nightclub. His mother, a piano teacher, would instruct him on various classical pieces, which he would then practice on the piano until he fell asleep. Eventually, when he was thirteen years old, he began to play the keyboard in secret, until his parents found out when he was fourteen.

Years later, his parents gave up the ban on popular music, and Holland moved to London, attending the Royal School of Music and then eventually pursued a scholarship in New York City, where he attended the Aaron Copland School of Music. During the mid-seventies, Holland began receiving calls from jazz legends including Steve Jordan and the Brecker Brothers, to do sessions with them. However, he did not have confidence in his own abilities, and so declined each time. His musical career began when he successfully auditioned as musical director at the Brooklyn Pilgrim Church. He then called in his colleagues from college to work with him, and eventually started his own gospel/fusion band.

As Holland's career blossomed, he received offers from numerous gospel artists, but he declined, in order to stay with the church, until he realized he would need more than the $350 per month salary he received. He then co-produced a Christmas album by Mariah Carey, with Carey and Walter Afanasieff, and also set up a writing and production deal with Zomba Music and Jive Records. He later worked at London's battery studio's, together with artists including Jonathan Butler and Ruby Turner, but quit work there after a dissatisfaction with cuts made on the album he had worked on with Turner, and after Zomba Music called his writing partners to join them. and his singers teamed up with Mariah Carey, (although they would still call on him to play music for them, and ask to use it in their tracks) he resumed work at the Brooklyn Pilgrim Church.

Holland was eventually asked by Tony Prendatt to help Fugees member Lauryn Hill, who was working on her own hip-hop record, but was unhappy with her players. When he played for her, she had him redo everything on the track, in favor of his work. She asked him to be her musical director, but he declined though he stayed and helped her band along.

Awards and nominations
He has been nominated for five Daytime Emmy awards from 2001 to 2005, all of which were for Outstanding Achievement in Music Direction and Composition for a Drama Series, for his work on All My Children. He won the award in 2002, 2003, and 2005. His first nomination was shared with Terry Walker, A.J. Gundell, Jerry Pilato, Dominic Messinger, Gary Kuo, Mike Renzi, John Wineglass, Brian Comotto, Robbie Kondor, and Ron Goodman. His first win was shared with the above, plus Peter Fish.

Credits
 Merry Christmas (1994)
 Grace (1994)
 Everyone Says I Love You (1996)
 A Day in Black and White (1999)
 All My Children
 Rude Buay (2008)
 The Hunt (2008)

References

External links
 Loris Holland's official website
 

Year of birth missing (living people)
Guyanese emigrants to the United States
Living people
American male composers
21st-century American composers
American male songwriters
Emmy Award winners
Alumni of the Royal College of Music
21st-century American male musicians